Forbesomyia is a genus of wood midges, insects in the family Cecidomyiidae. The one described species - Forbesomyia atra - is known from North America. The genus was established by Scottish entomologist John Russell Malloch in 1914.

References

Cecidomyiidae genera

Taxa named by John Russell Malloch
Insects described in 1914
Monotypic Diptera genera
Diptera of North America